Bruce Beall (born October 20, 1951) is an American rower. He competed in the men's quadruple sculls event at the 1984 Summer Olympics.

References

External links
 

1951 births
Living people
American male rowers
Olympic rowers of the United States
Rowers at the 1984 Summer Olympics
Rowers from Philadelphia
Pan American Games medalists in rowing
Pan American Games silver medalists for the United States
Pan American Games bronze medalists for the United States
Rowers at the 1971 Pan American Games
Rowers at the 1979 Pan American Games
Medalists at the 1971 Pan American Games